Derry is an unincorporated community in Natchitoches Parish, Louisiana, United States, located on Louisiana Highway 1.
It is the closest town to Magnolia Plantation, a National Historic Landmark.

References

Unincorporated communities in Louisiana
Unincorporated communities in Natchitoches Parish, Louisiana
Populated places in Ark-La-Tex